Boynton House may refer to:

Charles O. Boynton House, in Sycamore, Illinois
Charles O. Boynton Carriage House
Edward E. Boynton House, designed by Frank Lloyd Wright in Rochester, New York
Hale-Boynton House, in Newbury, Massachusetts